Jett Lawrence (born August 9, 2003, in Landsborough, Queensland, Australia) is an Australian Motocross racer.

Lawrence is the 2021 & 2022
AMA motocross national champion in the 250cc men's (4-stroke) category and the 2022 AMA Supercross Champion in the 250cc East category

Lawrence races for Honda motorcycles.

Jett's brother Hunter Lawrence is also a competitive motocross racer.

Career results

References 

2003 births
Living people
AMA Motocross Championship National Champions
Australian motocross riders